Andriy Zborovskyi (born 25 February 1986) is a Ukrainian football midfielder for PFC Sevastopol in the Ukrainian Premier League.

External links
Profile on Official Tavriya website 
Profile on Official FFU website 

Ukrainian footballers
SC Tavriya Simferopol players
FC Sevastopol players
1986 births
Living people
Sportspeople from Simferopol
Ukrainian Premier League players
FC TSK Simferopol players
FC Krymteplytsia Molodizhne players
FC Hvardiyets Hvardiiske players

Association football midfielders